Miroslav Mironov (28 November 1963 – 7 March 2014) was a Bulgarian footballer and coach.

References

1963 births
2014 deaths
Bulgarian footballers
FC Dunav Ruse players
PFC Slavia Sofia players
First Professional Football League (Bulgaria) players
Association football forwards
Bulgarian football managers
PFC Slavia Sofia managers